Revenge of the Goldfish is the third studio album by the English band Inspiral Carpets. It was released on 5 October 1992 through Mute Records. The band supported the album by touring with Sunscreem.

The album's cover art is a (cropped) 1981 photograph of an installation by contemporary artist Sandy Skoglund, also titled Revenge of the Goldfish.

Critical reception

The Toronto Star wrote that the album "returns to the punk-tinged sounds and loose feel of the Inspirals' debut, Life." The Chicago Tribune opined that "singer Tom Hingley bogs things down with his syrupy, overwrought vocals." The Los Angeles Times noted the "reverb-heavy guitars, grinding organs and brooding lyrics."

Track listing
 "Generations" – 2:44
 "Saviour" – 3:36
 "Bitches Brew" – 3:43
 "Smoking Her Clothes" – 3:36
 "Fire" – 3:24
 "Here Comes the Flood" – 3:50
 "Dragging Me Down" – 4:30
 "A Little Disappeared" – 2:48
 "Two Worlds Collide" – 4:25
 "Mystery" – 3:12
 "Rain Song" – 4:42
 "Irresistible Force" – 2:53

Singles
 Dung 16 – "Dragging Me Down" (1992)
 Dung 17 – "Two Worlds Collide" (1992)
 Dung 18 – "Generations" (1992)
 Dung 20 – "Bitches Brew" (1992)

Personnel
Clint Boon – keyboards, backing vocals
Craig Gill – drums
Tom Hingley – lead vocals
Graham Lambert – guitars
Martyn Walsh – bass

Charts

References

Inspiral Carpets albums
1992 albums
Mute Records albums
Albums produced by Pascal Gabriel